Julius Müller may refer to:

 Julius Müller (theologian) ( 1801-1878), German Protestant theologian
 Julius Müller (racewalker) (1938-2017), German racewalker
 Julius Müller (pole vaulter) (1903-1984), German pole vaulter
 Julius Müller, first person to use the Swiss-system tournament